Priscilla T. Neuman Cohn Ferrater Mora (December 14, 1933 – June 27, 2019) was an American philosopher and animal rights activist. She was Emerita Professor of Philosophy at Pennsylvania State University, associate director of the Oxford Centre for Animal Ethics, and co-editor of the centre's Journal of Animal Ethics.

Biography 
Cohn was born to Simon and Helen Neuman, one of five children, in Radnor Township, Pennsylvania, in 1933. She studied at Haverford Friends School, leaving early to study at Baldwin School in Bryn Mawr. In 1951, she eloped with Willard Cohn. Cohn then enrolled in Bryn Mawr College, earning a bachelor's, a master's, and a PhD in philosophy, between 1956 and 1969. She wrote her thesis on the work of Heidegger; her doctoral advisor was the Spanish philosopher José Ferrater Mora. She separated with Willard Cohn in 1969 (they divorced in 1980); Cohn married Ferrater Mora the same year.

She taught philosophy for more than 35 years at Pennsylvania State University, writing on a variety of topics including animals, environmental issues, and ethical problems, as well as on contemporary philosophers and the history of philosophy, publishing in both English and Spanish.

Cohn was made full Professor in Philosophy at Pennsylvania State University in 1982, and was made Professor Emerita at Pennsylvania State University Abington in 2001. She pioneered courses in animal ethics and lectured on five continents. From 1990 to 1993, she was Director of the Summer School Course in animal rights at Complutense University (Madrid) at El Escorial — which were the first courses of their kind in Spain. She also taught the Graduate School Course on Applied Ethics at the University of Santiago de Compostela, in 1991.
     
Her interest in wildlife was reflected in her work as the founder and director of P.N.C. Corp, a nonprofit animal rights foundation that organised the first international conference on contraception in wildlife in the United States and initiated and funded the first PZP fertility control study on white-tailed deer. She was also a board member of The Fund for Animals and Humane USA.

Cohn died at her home in Villanova, Pennsylvania, on 27 June 2019, due to complications relating to Parkinson's disease.

Selected publications 
 Etica aplicada (Alianza Editorial, 1981), written with José Ferrater Mora, containing the first essay on animal rights published in Spain
 Contraception in Wildlife (Edwin Mellen Press, 1996), edited with E. D. Plotka and U. S. Seal
 Ethics and Wildlife (Edwin Mellen Press, 1999)
 La Filosofia de Ferrater Mora (Documenta Universitaria, 2007)

See also
 List of animal rights advocates

Notes

Further reading
 Gruson, Lindsey. "Despite protests, deer hunts are set", The New York Times, 29 September 1985.
 "Editors & Consultant Editors, Journal of Animal Ethics", University of Illinois Press.

1933 births
2019 deaths
20th-century American philosophers
20th-century American women writers
21st-century American philosophers
21st-century American women writers
American women philosophers
Animal ethicists
American animal rights activists
American animal rights scholars
Bryn Mawr College alumni
Deaths from Parkinson's disease
Organization founders
Pennsylvania State University faculty
Philosophers from Pennsylvania
Academic staff of the University of Santiago de Compostela